Kozlubudzhak (also, Kozlu-Budzhakh) is a village in the Oghuz Rayon of Azerbaijan.

It is suspected that this village has undergone a name change or no longer exists, as no Azerbaijani website mentions it under this name.

References
 

Populated places in Oghuz District